Kapogea is a genus of orb-weaver spiders first described by Herbert Walter Levi in 1997.

Species
 it contains four species in the Americas, from Mexico to Brazil:
Kapogea cyrtophoroides (F. O. Pickard-Cambridge, 1904) – Mexico to Peru, Bolivia, Brazil
Kapogea isosceles (Mello-Leitão, 1939) – Greater Antilles, Panama to Argentina
Kapogea sellata (Simon, 1895) – Greater Antilles, Costa Rica to Argentina
Kapogea sexnotata (Simon, 1895) – Venezuela to Peru, Bolivia, Brazil

References

Araneidae
Araneomorphae genera
Spiders of Central America
Spiders of Mexico
Spiders of South America